The 2019 Thai League Cup Final was the final match of the 2019 Thai League Cup, the 10th season in the second era of a Thailand's football tournament organised by Football Association of Thailand. It was played at the SCG Stadium in Nonthaburi, Thailand on 28 September 2019, between Buriram United a big team from the Northeastern part and PT Prachuap a big team from the Western part of Thailand.

Road to the final

Note: In all results below, the score of the finalist is given first (H: home; A: away; T1: Clubs from Thai League 1; T2: Clubs from Thai League 2; T4: Clubs from Thai League 4.

Match

Details

Assistant referees:
 Chotrawee Tongduang
 Chaowalit Poonprasit
Fourth official:
 Sarayut Jakngoen
Match Commissioner:
 Akom Smuthkochorn
Referee Assessor:
 Praew Semaksuk
General Coordinator
 Woravit Sirirastakool

Winner

Prizes for winner
 A champion trophy.
 5,000,000 THB prize money.

Prizes for runners-up
 1,000,000 THB prize money.

See also
 2019 Thai League 1
 2019 Thai League 2
 2019 Thai League 3
 2019 Thai League 4
 2019 Thai FA Cup
 2019 Thai League Cup

References

External links
 Thai League official website
 Toyota League Cup official Facebook page
 TOYOTA Spirit of Football Facebook page

2019
2